Zimba District is a district of Southern Province, Zambia. Its capital lies at Zimba. It was separated from Kalomo District in 2012.

References 

Districts of Southern Province, Zambia